Tirupati Laddu or SriVari Laddu is the laddu sweet offered as Naivedhyam to Venkateswara at Tirumala Venkateswara Temple in Tirupati, Tirupati district, Andhra Pradesh, India. The laddu is given as prasadam to devotees after having the darshan in the temple. The laddu prasadam is prepared within the temple kitchen known as 'Potu' by the temple board Tirumala Tirupati Devasthanams. Tirupati Laddu received Geographical indication tag which entitles that only Tirumala Tirupati Devasthanams can make and sell it.

History 
The practice of offering laddu to Venkateswara at Tirumala Venkateswara Temple started on 2 August 1715.

Geographical indication tag 
To prevent black marketing of Tirupati Laddus, in 2008, the Tirumala Tirupati Devasthanams registered for a geographical indication tag. In 2009, it obtained patent rights to Tirupati Laddus under the category foodstuff under the GI Act 1999. This has prevented others from preparing or naming the sweet with same name.

Laddu Potu 
Laddu Potu is the kitchen where Tirupati Laddus are prepared. It lies inside the Sampangi pradakshinam of the temple. The Potu is equipped with three conveyor belts used for carrying ingredients into the potu and finished Laddus to the selling counters from Potu. Out of three conveyor belts the first one installed during 2007 can transfer only laddus and the second installed in the year 2010 can transfer both laddus and boondi. The third conveyor belt was installed in 2014 as a backup for the two conveyor belts should they malfunction. In olden days only fire wood was used to cook laddus, which was replaced by LPG in the year 1984.

Tirumala Tirupati Devasthanams prepare an average of 2.8 lakh laddus a day in Laddu potu. At present, the potu has a capacity to make 800,000 a day.

Dittam 
Dittam is the list of ingredients and its proportions used in making of Tirupati Laddu. To meet the increasing demand for laddus, changes were made to Dittam six times in its history. At present the ingredients include Gram flour, cashew nuts, cardamom, ghee, sugar, sugar candy and raisins. Per day it uses about 10 tonnes of Gram flour, 10 tonnes of sugar, 700 kg of cashew nuts, 150 kg of cardamom, 300 to 500 litres of ghee, 500 kg of sugar candy and 540 kg of raisins used to prepare laddu. TTD procures all these based on tenders on yearly basis.

Potu karmikulu 

Around 620 cooks work in the laddu potu to make laddus. These workers are referred to as potu karmikulu. Around 150 Potu Workers are regular employees, while more than 350 work on Contract Basis. 247 are chef out of 620.

Tirupati Laddu variations

Proktham Laddu 
This laddu is regularly distributed to all the common pilgrims visiting the temple. It is small in size and weighs 175 grams. These laddus are prepared in large numbers.

Asthanam Laddu 
This laddu is prepared only on special festive occasions. It is large in size and weighs 750 grams. It is prepared with more cashews, almonds and saffron strands.

Kalyanotsavam Laddu 
This laddu is distributed to devotees who participate in Kalyanotsavam and in a few of Arjitha sevas. There is huge demand for these laddus. These are prepared in very few numbers when compared to the Proktham Laddu. Shelf Life of the laddu is about to 15 days with the advanced packaging system implemented by TTD.

See also 
List of Geographical Indications in India

Reference

External links 

Tirumala Venkateswara Temple
Religious food and drink
Tirupati
Tirumala Tirupati Devasthanams
Geographical indications in Andhra Pradesh